The 4th Nunavut Legislature began after the 2013 general election on October 29. The election returned 20 of the 22 non-partisan members, with the results in two seats pending judicial recounts or follow-up by-elections due to a tied result on election day. After the official recount held November 5, 2013, the district of Rankin Inlet South was found to be still tied and Uqqummiut was won by two votes.

Change of premier
After the election the Legislative Assembly of Nunavut met to select a new premier of Nunavut. Incumbent premier Eva Aariak was defeated in her district on election day, although she had already indicated that she did not wish to stand for a second term as premier.

Membership in the 4th assembly
A list of members returned in the 2013 general election and subsequent deferred elections.

Members elected in October 2013

Membership changes
Nuqingaq was expelled from the legislature on October 24, 2014 after repeatedly engaging in disorderly and inappropriate conduct, vacating Uqqummiut and resulting in a by-election which was held on February 9, 2015. The by-election was won by Pauloosie Keyootak.

Ugyuk, who was chosen as the Family Services Minister, lost a non-confidence vote on November 7, 2015, during a leadership review of the cabinet. As a result of the non-confidence vote a motion was made to remove Ugyuk from cabinet. On November 9, prior to discussion on the motion, Ugyuk resigned both from cabinet and as MLA and the motion was withdrawn. A by-election was held in February 2016, and was won by Emiliano Qirngnuq.

References

External links
Legislative Assembly of Nunavut official website

4
Legislature, 4
Legislature, 4